Gail Cronauer is an American stage, television, and feature film actress and an acting professor. She has performed in films as diverse as Oliver Stone's JFK to the TV series, Walker, Texas Ranger. She is a recipient of the 2007 Dallas Fort Worth Theater Critics Forum award, for her role in the Lyric Stage production Master Class.

Early life and career
Gail Cronauer was born in Pennsylvania and grew up in New Jersey. Gail attended Antioch College for her undergraduate degree, and after working on the musical Viet Rock, was galvanized to pursue a career in theatre and dance. She obtained her BA in theatre and dance from Antioch College in 1971 and then got her MFA in acting from the Case Western Reserve University. Gail moved to Dallas in 1979 to teach acting at Southern Methodist University, where she met her husband Mark Hougland in the university's graduate theatre program.

Gail also has taught acting at Illinois State University, Southern Methodist University, Webster College, the University of Wisconsin–Green Bay, Texas Women's University, and most recently at Collin College, where she worked from 1992 until her retirement in 2020. She is a member of Actors' Equity Association, Screen Actors Guild/AFTRA and Women in Film and Television International.

Filmography

Awards
2007 Dallas Fort Worth Theater Critics Forum- Actress

References

External links

1948 births
Living people
American film actresses
American stage actresses
American television actresses
Actresses from Dallas
Antioch College alumni
Case Western Reserve University alumni
Illinois State University faculty
Southern Methodist University faculty
Texas Woman's University faculty
University of Wisconsin–Green Bay faculty
Actors' Equity Association
Screen Actors Guild
American women academics
21st-century American women